Ecovacs Robotics is a Chinese technology company. It is best known for developing in-home robotic appliances. The company was founded in 1998 by Qian Dongqi and is headquartered in Suzhou, China. According to Global Asia, Ecovacs Robotics had more than 60% of the Chinese market for robots by 2013.

History

In 1998, Qian Dongqi founded Ecovacs Robotics as an original equipment manufacturer for vacuum cleaners under the name TEK Electrical Company. The company rebranded in late 2006 as an independent manufacturer of robotic devices for home cleaning. By 2007, Ecovacs Robotics had introduced its floor cleaning Deebot series. The product was featured and had a recurring role on Real World: Skeletons in 2015.

From 2012 to 2014, Ecovacs Robotics expanded its operations with offices in the United States, Germany and Japan. The company also introduced products for mobile entertainment and security, air purification and window cleaning. Ecovacs Robotics collaborated and partnered with Marvel Entertainment for limited edition themed Deebots to coincide with the release of Captain America: Civil War.

Products
It produces the DEEBOT, a floor cleaning robot, ATMOBOT, an air purifying robot, and WINBOT, a window cleaning robot.
Deebot is a floor cleaning vacuum, which uses smart motion technology that guides the robot which can vacuum and wet mop floors. The Deebot has anti-drop and anti-collision sensors to navigate around objects for cleaning. Winbot is a window cleaning robot which debuted at the Consumer Electronics Show in Las Vegas. It suctions onto a vertical glass surface and cleans using microfiber pads and a squeegee. Ecovacs featured BENEBOT, a shopping assist robot, at the Consumer Electronics Show.  In August 2016, Ecovacs released the UNIBOT, a smart robot with floor cleaning, home monitoring and air-purifying features. In 2021, Ecovacs release the DEEBOT T9+, a robotic vacuum which uses obstacle avoidance technology to avoid objects when cleaning, it also comes complete with an auto-empty station. The DEEBOT T9+ also includes OZMO 2.0 technology which operates a vibrating mop along with an airfresher (scent: wild bluebell).

Ecovacs Robotics sells cordless stick vacuums under the brand Tineco.

Recognition
The company was recognized by the Consumer Electronics Show for its solar panel cleaning robot, receiving the 2015 CES Innovation Award.

See also 
 iRobot

References

External links

Chinese companies established in 1998
Electronics companies established in 1998
Manufacturing companies based in Suzhou
Home appliance brands
Robotics companies of China
Robotic vacuum cleaners
Chinese brands